Rachel "Macca" Stowell (née McArthur; born 27 July 1977) is a former English football player, who played as a central midfielder. She finished her career with Leicester City Women after season 2009–10, and is a former member of the England squad.

Club career
Stowell joined Bristol City Women aged 12 and played with her local club for seven years before moving to Southampton Saints. With Southampton, Stowell played in the 1999 FA Women's Cup final. She was a full-time professional player with Fulham from 2000 until 2003. Stowell later played for Bristol City Ladies again, Arsenal Ladies and Leeds United Ladies. Stowell joined Leicester City after a period of inactivity after childbirth and an ACL injury. She captained Leicester to third place in the 2009–10 FA Women's Premier League Northern Division, then retired at the end of the season.

International career
Stowell made her senior England debut against Norway, playing at right-back in a 3–1 defeat at the Algarve Cup in March 2002.

International goals
Scores and results list England's goal tally first.

Personal life

She married former Wolves goalkeeper Mike Stowell in June 2009, following the birth of their daughter in April of the previous year. The two married whilst they both were in Leicester. Rachel being a Leicester City Women's player and her husband, Mike Stowell, being the goalkeeping coach at Leicester City FC

References

1977 births
Living people
English women's footballers
Leeds United Women F.C. players
Arsenal W.F.C. players
Southampton Saints L.F.C. players
Fulham L.F.C. players
England women's international footballers
FA Women's National League players
Footballers from Bristol
Leicester City W.F.C. players
Women's association football midfielders